Guoli is a town in Zoucheng, Jining, in southwestern Shandong province, China. , it has 39 villages under its administration.

References

Township-level divisions of Shandong
Zoucheng